Auburn Lake Trails is a census-designated place in El Dorado County, California. It lies at an elevation of 1916 feet (584 m). As of the 2010 census, the population was 3,426.

Demographics

At the 2010 census Auburn Lake Trails had a population of 3,426. The racial makeup of Auburn Lake Trails was 3,190 (93.1%) White, 6 (0.2%) African American, 28 (0.8%) Native American, 36 (1.1%) Asian, 5 (0.1%) Pacific Islander, 45 (1.3%) from other races, and 116 (3.4%) from two or more races. Hispanic or Latino of any race were 208 people (6.1%).

The whole population lived in households, no one lived in non-institutionalized group quarters and no one was institutionalized.

There were 1,366 households, 383 (28.0%) had children under the age of 18 living in them, 891 (65.2%) were opposite-sex married couples living together, 90 (6.6%) had a female householder with no husband present, 47 (3.4%) had a male householder with no wife present.  There were 62 (4.5%) unmarried opposite-sex partnerships, and 18 (1.3%) same-sex married couples or partnerships. 266 households (19.5%) were one person and 111 (8.1%) had someone living alone who was 65 or older. The average household size was 2.51.  There were 1,028 families (75.3% of households); the average family size was 2.86.

The age distribution was 720 people (21.0%) under the age of 18, 185 people (5.4%) aged 18 to 24, 631 people (18.4%) aged 25 to 44, 1,294 people (37.8%) aged 45 to 64, and 596 people (17.4%) who were 65 or older.  The median age was 48.3 years. For every 100 females, there were 93.7 males.  For every 100 females age 18 and over, there were 94.7 males.

The homeowner vacancy rate was 2.6%; the rental vacancy rate was 3.1%.  3,017 people (88.1% of the population) lived in owner-occupied housing units and 409 people (11.9%) lived in rental housing units.

References

Census-designated places in El Dorado County, California
Gated communities in California
Census-designated places in California